Martin Müller-Falcke (born 26 April 1972) is a German former rower. He competed in the men's lightweight coxless four event at the 2004 Summer Olympics.

References

External links
 

1972 births
Living people
German male rowers
Olympic rowers of Germany
Rowers at the 2004 Summer Olympics
People from Rinteln
Sportspeople from Lower Saxony